Andre Tucker is an American football Trainer and currently the Head Athletic Trainer for the Chicago Bears of the National Football League (NFL). He was previously Assistant Head Athletic Trainer for the Miami Dolphins, the Jacksonville Jaguars, the Atlanta Falcons and the Cleveland Browns.

References

Living people
American strength and conditioning coaches
Chicago Bears coaches
Cleveland Browns coaches
Atlanta Falcons coaches
Jacksonville Jaguars coaches
Year of birth missing (living people)